The Prefetti di Vico was the name of an Italian noble family, of German origin, who established themselves in Rome from the 10th century.

History 
They obtained the title of praefect urbis (prefect of the city) by the Holy Roman Emperor. The rest of the name derived from the Lake Vico, in northern Lazio, where most of their lands were located. They family members held the title until 1437, when the last member of the family was defeated by cardinal Giovanni Vitelleschi in the battle of Vetralla.

References

Families of post-ancient Rome